This article lists all peerages held by prime ministers of the United Kingdom, whether created or inherited before or after their premiership. Extant titles are in bold.

Peerages created for prime ministers

Peerages inherited before, during or after premiership
Irish and Scottish Peers did not have an automatic seat in the House of Lords unlike their English and British counterparts, until the Peerage Act 1963 which granted all Scottish Peers (those without Imperial status) to have an automatic seat in the House of Lords until the passing of the House of Lords Act 1999, and Peers to disclaim their own peerage for the rest of their life, which Alec Douglas-Home did on the 23 October 1963.

Lord Palmerston never sat in the House of Lords as he was a holder of an Irish Peerage, but sat as a Member of Parliament for Tiverton during his two spells as Prime Minister.

Prime ministers never raised to the peerage

See also
List of prime ministers of the United Kingdom
List of peerages created for Lord Chancellors and Lord Keepers
List of peerages created for speakers of the House of Commons

Notes

External links
Prime Ministers in History from the 10 Downing Street website.

Prime Ministers of the United Kingdom
Peerages
Prime Ministers